Fika is a Local Government Area in Yobe State, Nigeria.

It has an area of 2,852 km and a population of 215,000 at the 2022 census.

The postal code of the area is 622.

Geography
The northeasterly line of equal latitude and longitude passes through the area close to Fika.

Gadaka is Also the largest town in the Fika LGA. It is located at about 12 km off the Potiskum-Gombe main road, about 55 km from the commercial city of Potiskum.

List of Districts under Fika 
Daya

Fika

Gadaka

Shembire

Gudi

Dozi

Godo wali

Maluri

Janga

Boza

Zangaya

Mazawaun

Mubi

Fusami

Garin wayo

T.nanai

Fa.sawa

See also 
 List of Local Government Areas in Yobe State

References

Local Government Areas in Yobe State